St. Mary's Hall was a Christian school that existed in Shanghai, China, established by the Episcopal Church of the United States.

History 

The history of St. Mary's Hall, Shanghai goes back to a training school that was started in 1851 near the Episcopal Cathedral in Shanghai.  This school was officially named as St. Mary's Hall in 1881 and was located next to St. John's College. In 1923, it moved to Brenan Road (currently No. 1187 Changning Road) of Shanghai International Settlement. Because of high tuition, St. Mary's and McTyeire School for Girls of the Methodist Church were called the "Christian Schools for Wealthy/Noble Maidens". English Literatures, Home Economics, and Music/Dancing subjects there were famous.

After the establishment of the People's Republic of China, St. Mary's Hall was merged with McTyeire School to become No. 3 Middle School of Shanghai City, located at No. 155 Jiangsu Road in 1952. The site of St. Mary's Hall was used by the Shanghai Spinning Industry College, and then, in 1999, became the Chang'an Branch of Donghua University's Spinning Industry Department.

As of 2020, the former school buildings of St. Mary’s Hall have been preserved and renovated as part of a new commercial complex.

After the Kuomintang government moved to Taiwan, the alumni and other people related to St. Mary's Hall and St. John's University established a school which later became St. John's University (Taiwan).

Noted alumna 
Eileen Chang
Gong Peng

See also
St. John's University, Shanghai 
St. John's University (Taiwan) 
Chung Hua Sheng Kung Hui
Episcopal Church of the United States

References

External links 

Private schools in Shanghai
Episcopal Church (United States)
Christian schools in China
Defunct schools in China
Girls' schools in China